Darren Murray (born 4 February 1976, in Oldham) is a Scottish former professional footballer.

Career
Murray began his senior career with Cowdenbeath. He had a short spell with Maryhill, and in the summer of 1998, he was part of the Junior revolution which swept through Clyde, being one of eleven players coming from the junior ranks to join the Bully Wee. He was a key figure in the team which won the Scottish Second Division championship in 2000.

Murray left Clyde in 2001. Since retiring Darren has worked in the security and delivery business

External links

1974 births
Living people
Scottish Junior Football Association players
Footballers from Glasgow
Maryhill F.C. players
Scottish footballers
Scottish Football League players
Clyde F.C. players
Cowdenbeath F.C. players
Association football defenders